The South Burnie Football Club is an Australian rules football club, based in the town of Burnie, Tasmania. It currently competes in the Darwin Football Association (DFA), and is the most successful club in DFA history. The club was initially known as APPM (for Associated Pulp and Paper Mills Ltd.), and was formed in 1941, five years after the Burnie pulp factory itself. After competing in the DFA in 1941, the disbanding of the league in 1944 resulted in the club being admitted to the North West Football Union (NWFU) in 1945. The club rejoined the reformed DFA as a founding member in 1951, deciding to change its name from APPM to South Burnie in 1956. After a two-year stint in the Northern Tasmanian Football League (NTFL) in 1997–1998, the hawks returned to the DFA and enjoyed a sustained period of success. From 2000 to 2019, the senior team reached the finals every season, playing 11 Grand Finals and winning 7 premierships. The club's reserves team in the same period played in 17 Grand Finals, winning 14 premierships including an incredible unbeaten streak of 11 flags from 2006 to 2016. The club holds the most senior premierships in the DFA with 14.

History

The club was nicknamed ‘the pulp’ after being born from the APPM paper mill in 1941, its colours being maroon and gold. The club first competed in the DFA for season 1941, the Emu Bay Association in 1942, the Burnie Junior Association in 1943, and once again in the DFA in 1944. Then from 1945 until 1951 the club competed in the NWFU. Its 1945 debut season in the NWFU saw APPM claim its first ever premiership with a 31-point, 13.16 (94) to 8.15 (63) Grand Final defeat of East Devonport. Four years later in 1949 it again tasted premiership success, this time at the expense of Ulverstone, winning on this occasion by 27 points after trailing at three-quarter time, 14.12 (96) to 9.15 (69). Two years later in 1951 the club joined the reformed DFA as a founding member, in the end spending only six seasons in the NWFU, but reaping 2 premierships during that tenure.

After rejoining the DFA, success soon followed with the pulp claiming the 1954 premiership after finishing fourth on the ladder, winning by the closest possible margin of 1 point against top side Montello 6. 9. (45) to 6. 8. (44). This was the last flag won by APPM, after a decision was taken by the club to change its name two seasons following this maiden DFA premiership. “The name change of South Burnie occurred at the start of the 1956 season, when it was obvious that more players would come from different areas of employment and it made sense to identify with the surrounding suburb.” In addition the club changed its strip from maroon and gold to brown and gold, while representing themselves as the hawks.

This appears to have been a good decision, as the club went on to win the 1959 premiership against Yeoman by 14 points, followed by a successful run in the sixties, winning 3 premierships. The first of those was in 1962 against Cam (now Somerset) by 17 points, 11. 12. (78) to 8. 13. (61). Five seasons later the club won back-to-back premierships at the expense of Ridgley, beginning with the 1967 victory of 31 points 15. 11. (101) to 11. 4. (70). The 1968 rematch was won by a margin of 39 points, 14. 9. (93) to 8. 6. (54). This was however to be the last time South Burnie would taste glory for another two and a half decades, the seventies proving the worst period in club history with three wooden spoons (last place). The eighties proved slightly better, with a Grand Final appearance in 1984 though losing by 22 points to a Yolla team that dominated that decade. The reserves team however earned its first premiership with a 33-point victory over Yolla in 1987, going back-to-back with a narrow 5 point victory over the same club in 1988. It was not until the nineteen nineties that South Burnie would overcome this unsuccessful, frustrating era.

In season 1994, and after 26 years without a senior Grand Final victory, the hawks finally broke their premiership drought in style with convincing back-to-back flags in 1994–1995, first dispatching Somerset by 51 points, 15.18. (108) to 8.9. (57), backed up by an 87-point hammering of West Ulverstone, 22.16. (148) to 7.19. (61), the club's greatest ever winning margin in a Grand Final, and also the DFA record margin at that time. Shortly after these successes the club decided to try its luck at a higher level in the NTFL for season 1997, however, this venture proved unsuccessful and difficult to sustain, and following the end of the 1998 season, the hawks returned to the DFA for season 1999.

The turn of the millennium coincided with the club gaining momentum to what would become the most dominant period in its history, beginning with a grand final appearance in 2001 although losing heavily to a dominant Natone by 86 points, 18.20. (128) to 6.6. (42). The Under 17 youth team, however, collected its maiden premiership defeating Yeoman. In 2003 the club was again facing off in a grand final, though losing again albeit narrowly in a dour, low-scoring affair to Myalla, 4.5. (29) to 3.3. (21).

2004 however saw the club earn its 8th DFA premiership, overcoming Cuprona by 25 points, 12.6. (78) to 7.11. (53). Cuprona controlled the match until halfway through the third quarter, when they had a 20-point lead, but the hawks began to get on top and the margin became seven points at three quarter time. They continued their momentum into the last quarter to come away with the silverware, and many regarded this as the most even, skillful and entertaining Grand Final for years. They failed to back up their success the following year, although the Under 17 youth team was able to win its second premiership in 2005 defeating Devonport. The club earned a Grand Final berth in season 2006 but again lost the game, on this occasion to Yolla by a margin of 20 points, 10. 11. (71) to 7. 9. (53). From season 2006 however, the club's reserves side began their amazing streak of 11 consecutive premierships, stretching from 2006 to 2016, an achievement which may never be surpassed. The senior side however, although having its share of success and playing finals, frustratingly could not break through to another grand final until the 2012 season.

Following a fifth-place finish in 2011, the hawks finished the regular season in 2012 in second position, and earned a grand final berth against a Ridgley side which had only been beaten on two occasions. Facing a 31-point deficit at quarter time, the club clawed its way back, and then ran over the saints, in the end becoming premiers by 32 points and finally earning the ultimate reward for their consistent finals runs. 2012 also became the season that the club won the double for the first time in its history (both senior and reserves premiers), the reserves side also overcoming Ridgley to win its 7th consecutive flag.

2013 was a more complete season, the hawks dominating finishing atop the ladder. Although stumbling in the semi-final with a 4 Point loss to Ridgley, an 81-point Preliminary final win over Queenstown was backed up with a 50-point Grand Final victory again over the saints. As the reserves continued their premiership streak, the club earned back to back doubles for the first time in club, and DFA history. A dominant history making season for the South Burnie Football Club, and it appeared as though the form would continue into the following season as the club yearned to achieve a three peat. 2014 however saw the hawks attempt cut down. Although dominating the regular season again finishing atop the ladder for the second consecutive year, they could not overcome an inspired Queenstown in a nailbiting semi final, losing by just 2 points. Somerset then ended their season in unceremonious fashion in the preliminary final to the tune of 62 points.

In season 2015 however, the club returned once again to the grand final stage, this time against a skillful Somerset side which had finished the regular season on top of the ladder and dispatched the hawks in the semi-final by 32 points. The grand final itself “will go down in folklore as one of the greatest, if not the greatest.” After a poor first half the hawks were completely outplayed by the roos, and it appeared as though the game was over with a 43-point half time deficit. Halfway into the third quarter however, the hawks began to gain some momentum and couldn't be stopped, piling on the goals to narrow the margin to 10 points at three-quarter time. Early into the last stanza the momentum kept rolling, with the club hitting the front and gaining a 9-point lead before Somerset stemmed the flow, the remainder of the quarter going goal for goal with the roos finally regaining a 3-point lead with 2 minutes left in the match. But the hawks weren't done, and they managed to score a final goal with a minute remaining. The team coolly retained possession of the football in the dying seconds to deny Somerset the flag, and secured one of the greatest ever grand final comebacks to win the 2015 premiership by 3 points. The reserves in contrast dominated their grand final, winning by 81 points en route to their 10th consecutive premiership, and the club's third double in four seasons.

Following the exhilarating 2015 victory, the 2016 season began slowly for the hawks, with Natone surprising the competition, leading the ladder until the final game of the season when an incredible 158 point victory for the hawks over the magpies earned them top spot. From there the premiership was South's to lose. The hawks had incredibly not won a semi-final since 2006 from 6 attempts but with a hoodoo breaking semi-final win over Natone by 78 points, and a Grand Final win of 64 points again against the magpies, secured the club its 12th DFA premiership; its fourth in five years, its fourth double in five years, and assured its current status as the most successful club in DFA history to date. Coach Rohan Baldock capped off a successful season on an individual note, kicking 241 goals for the season, an effort which places him second on the all-time goal kicking record in a season in Australian football. The club also recorded its greatest ever winning margin in a game, 322 points against Yolla in round 18. 2016 thus put an exclamation mark on the most successful period in club history.

Although gun forward and coach Baldock departed the club for the 2017 season, the hawks fourth attempt at achieving the three peat began promisingly with the appointment of state league player Zane Murphy as senior coach. In round 8 Murphy equalled Alan Newman's 1987 record for most goals scored in a single game with 23. In round 16 the hawks' ruthlessness against the demons in recent years went to another level as they smashed their highest ever recorded score to 391 points, and greatest ever winning margin to 377 points. It was also the highest score in the DFA's 67-year history, 62.19 (391), eclipsing Natone's 58.32 (380) in 2001, with Zane Murphy (13 goals) and Kurt Lamprey (19 goals) also becoming the first two players to ever achieve the century goal kicking mark from the same club on the same day.

The club finished the regular season on top of the ladder, one game ahead of the Somerset Football Club, who had defeated the hawks in their past two meetings. The semi-final showdown was contested against the roos, under lights and in wet conditions where the hawks put on a dominant physical display to win by 55 points and book a third straight grand final appearance. On the eve of the grand final assistant coach Jake Brakey captured a record fourth Ewington medal as the best and fairest player in the DFA, also a club record. As it transpired, Somerset would again be their opponent from whom the hawks had snatched the 2015 premiership by 3 points.

In the 2017 DFA grand final, South Burnie put on another dominant performance, smashing the roos by a massive 138 points. They kicked a record grand final highest score of 23. 24. (162) which eclipsed the previous record, the 87 point and 22. 16. (148) win also achieved by South Burnie in 1995 when they defeated West Ulverstone. In addition the club finally achieved the three peat for the first time in its history, and from 2012 claiming five premierships within six years, matching the same achievement by the Yolla Football Club, between 1979 and 1984.

The club had the opportunity to make it five doubles in six years but the reserves amazing flag run unfortunately came to an end. It took a goal in the dying seconds of the grand final to break the streak, ending one of Australian football's most incredible records. However, season 2017 proved to be yet another record breaking year in the most dominant period in club history.

Season 2018 began poorly with the departure of the head coach on the eve of the opening round. In addition, a win/loss record of 1-3 after the opening 4 rounds and a loss of over 200 points at the hands of minor premiers Queenstown, suggested the club was on a steep fall from grace. Scraping into 3rd position at the conclusion of the regular season however, at least earned the club the double chance in the finals. Experience and grit came to the fore as the hawks played a ruthless final series highlighted by relentless pressure and composure on the ball. Defeating Cuprona by 30 points in the qualifying final, the hawks met the undefeated and fancied crows in the semi, which they dominated to a 78-point win, leaving the crows almost as shell-shocked as the spectators. The club again played a great grand final, claiming the 2018 premiership by 57 points and becoming the first club in DFA history to win 4 consecutive flags.  Although the reserves grand final dominance came to an end, the club's 14th DFA premiership, and 6th in 7 years, well and truly sealed their status as the most dominant club in the competition.

The 2019 season was another challenging year for the club with heavy defeats to Somerset and Queenstown, though again finished the regular season in third place. However, after accounting for Cuprona (20. 13. 133 to 4. 6. 30) and Queenstown (17. 16. 118 to 11. 7. 73) in the Semi and Preliminary Finals respectively, the hawks earned a fifth straight grand final appearance against Somerset, whom they had defeated in the 2015 and 2017 grand finals previously. Although the hawks had fought hard to make the contest a close 8 points at half time, they could not match the pace and fitness of the ladder leading roos, eventually succumbing to a 64-point defeat. While the flag winning run came to an end however, the club's underdog reserves fought their way back from behind to claim a 26-point grand final victory, the first reserves flag for three years.

The COVID-19 global pandemic saw season 2020 cancelled for the DFA. The 2021 season went ahead in spite of the pandemic, though a number of contributing factors resulted in the club missing out on finals football for the first time in over two decades, ending a greatly successful period of consistent finals football and 7 senior premierships. The 2022 season saw the return of 2016 premiership coach Rohan Baldock as senior coach, and the return to finals football for the club, finishing in second place on the ladder after a seventh-place finish in 2021.

Club song 
The club has had two team songs during its life, the APPM song, and the South Burnie song:

APPM Football Club song

“We are the Pulp boys”

We are a jolly lot of chaps,

And each one is a star.

And if it's not at football

You'll find us at the bar.

And if you care to join us

You know that it's alright,

For you can be a member
 
Of the Pulp Work's team tonight.

(Chorus)

We are the Pulp team,

We are the team.

We can't be beaten

That's easily seen.

At the end of the season,

You'll know the reason,
 
Why we are the premier team.

South Burnie Football Club song

We’re a happy team South Burnie,

We’re the mighty fighting hawks.

We love our club
 
And we play to win

Riding the bumps with a grin, South Burnie.

Come what may you'll find us striving

Teamwork is the thing that counts (4,3,2),

One for all and all for one's

The way we play South Burnie

We are the mighty fighting hawks.

Honours 

Greatest winning margin – 2017 - 377 points v Yolla at Wivenhoe – 62. 19. (391) to 2. 2. (14)

Highest score – 2017 -  62. 19. (391) v Yolla 2. 2. (14)

Lowest score - 1. 3. (9) – 1954

Premierships (16)

NWFU – 1945, 1949

DFA – 1954, 1959, 1962, 1967, 1968, 1994, 1995, 2004, 2012, 2013, 2015, 2016, 2017, 2018

Inter Association Premiers – 1968

DFA Reserves Premierships – 1987, 1988, 2002, 2003, 2006, 2007, 2008, 2009, 2010, 2011, 2012, 2013, 2014, 2015, 2016, 2019

Under 17 Premierships – 2001, 2005

Grand Finals 

NWFU

1945 – APPM 13.16 (94) df. East Devonport 8.15 (63) 31 points

1949 - APPM 14.12 (96) df. Ulverstone 9.15 (69) 27 points

DFA

1954 – APPM 6. 9. (45) df. Montello 6. 8. (44) 1 point

1959 – South Burnie 13. 5. (83) df. Yeoman 10. 9. (69) 14 points

1962 – South Burnie 11. 12. (78) df. Cam 8. 13. (61) 17 points

1967 – South Burnie 15. 11. (101) df. Ridgley 11. 4. (70) 31 points

1968 – South Burnie 14. 9. (93) df. Ridgley 8. 6. (54) 39 points

1984 – Yolla 17. 12. (114) df. South Burnie 13. 14. (92) 22 points

1994 – South Burnie 15. 18. (108) df. Somerset 8. 9. (57) 51 points
 
1995 – South Burnie 22. 16. (148) df. West Ulverstone 7. 19. (61) 87 points

1996 – Natone – 15. 12. (102) df. South Burnie 11. 7. (73) 29 points

2001 – Natone df. 18. 19. (127) df. South Burnie 6. 6. (42) 85 points

2003 – Myalla 4. 5. (29) df. South Burnie 3. 2. (20) 9 points

2004 – South Burnie 12. 6. (78) df. Cuprona 7. 11. (53) 25 points

2006 – Yolla 10. 11. (71) df. South Burnie 7. 9. (51) 20 points

2012 – South Burnie 15. 17. (107) df. Ridgley 10. 15. (75) 32 points

2013 – South Burnie 18. 11. (119) df. Ridgley 10. 9. (69) 50 points

2015 – South Burnie 19. 14. (128) df. Somerset 19. 11. (125) 3 points

2016 – South Burnie 20. 22. (142) df. Natone 12. 6. (78) 64 points

2017 - South Burnie 23. 24. (162) df. Somerset 3. 6. (24) 138 points

2018 - South Burnie 12. 13. (85) df. Queenstown 3. 10 (28) 57 points

2019 - Somerset 17. 17. (119) df. South Burnie 7. 13. (55) 64 points

Reserves Grand Finals

1971 – Myalla 9. 5. (59) df. South Burnie 7. 5. (47) 12 points

1983 – Yolla 9. 9. (63) df. South Burnie 6. 13. (49) 14 points

1985 – West Ulverstone 16. 9. (105) df. South Burnie 12. 12. (84) 21 points

1987 – South Burnie 11. 17. (83) df. Yolla 7. 8. (50) 33 points

1988 – South Burnie 11. 9. (75) df. Yolla 10. 10. (70) 5 points

1996 – Yeoman 6. 8. (44) df. South Burnie 4. 9. (33) 11 points

2000 – Natone 7. 10. (52) df. South Burnie 4. 8. (32) 20 points

2001 – Yolla 4. 6. (30) df. South Burnie 4. 3. (27) 3 points

2002 – South Burnie 9. 7. (61) df. Natone 1. 6. (12) 49 points

2003 – South Burnie 4. 12. (36) df. Natone 4. 8. (32) 4 points

2006 – South Burnie 13. 12. (90) df. Somerset 11. 10. (76) 14 points

2007 – South Burnie 17. 11. (113) df. Somerset 8. 12. (60) 53 points

2008 – South Burnie 19. 12. (126) df. Somerset 12. 8. (80) 46 points

2009 – South Burnie 18. 5. (113) df. Somerset 8. 5. (53) 60 points

2010 – South Burnie 13. 14. (92) df. Somerset 9. 9. (63) 29 points

2011 – South Burnie 25. 20. 170 df. Natone 9. 3. (57) 113 points

2012 – South Burnie 15. 13. (103) df. Ridgley 10. 7. (67) 36 points

2013 – South Burnie 14. 10. (94) df. Ridgley 7. 11. (53) 41 points

2014 – South Burnie 15. 15. (105) df. Queenstown 10. 10. (70) 35 points

2015 – South Burnie 16. 9. (115) df. Somerset 4. 10. (34) 81 points

2016 – South Burnie 8. 15. (63) df. Somerset 5. 10. (40) 23 points

2017 - Somerset 8. 4. (52) df. South Burnie 6. 10. (46) 6 points

2019 - South Burnie 12. 9. (81) df. Somerset 8. 7. (55) 26 points

1968 inter association grand final

South Burnie 24. 16. (160) df. Gowrie Park (NWFA) 3. 8. (26)

Snooks Medal (Best afield Grand Final)

1994 J. Overton
1995 M. Hayes
2004 A. Smith
2012 K. Lamprey
2013 K. Lamprey
2016 C. Wedd
2017 Z. Murphy
2018 K. Bracken

Ewington medal (DFA Senior Best and Fairest)

1952 B. Kerr
1961 W. Parker
1970 K. Redman
1979 G. Jackson
1980 J. Seelig
1982 D. Green
1991 P. Guard
1992 P. Guard
2004 R. Townsend 
2006 J. Collins
2011 J. Brakey 
2012 J. Brakey
2014 J. Brakey
2017 J. Brakey

President 

1941
1942
1943
1944 P. Bryce
1945 P. Bryce
1946 P. Bryce
1947 G. Moline
1948
1949 A. Muir
1950 A. Muir
1951 A. Muir
1952 A. Muir
1953 A. Muir
1954 A. Muir
1955 M. Jenkins
1956 W. Brakey
1957 W. Brakey
1958 W. Brakey
1959 W. Brakey

1960 W. Brakey
1961 W. Brakey
1962 W. Brakey
1963 W. Brakey
1964 W. Brakey
1965 W. Brakey
1966 W. Brakey
1967 W. Brakey
1968 W. Brakey
1969 G. Hammond
1970 G. Hammond
1971 R. Johns
1972 R. Johns
1973 T. Snooks
1974 B. Walker
1975 B. Walker
1976 B. Walker
1977 B. Walker
1978 B. Walker
1979 B. Walker

1980 G. Cocks
1981 G. Cocks
1982 N. McCarthy
1983 N. McCarthy
1984 N. McCarthy
1985 K. Moles
1986 K. Moles
1987 R. Milne
1988 G. Monson
1989 E. Gillow
1990 W. Parker
1991 W. Parker
1992 W. Parker
1993 S. Kelly
1994 T. Snooks
1995 T. Snooks
1996 C. Swain
1997 C. Swain
1998 T. Snooks
1999 T. Snooks

2000 M. Kelly
2001 M. Kelly
2002 M. Kelly
2003 J. Radford
2004 J. Radford
2005 J. Radford
2006 J. Radford
2007 J. Radford
2008 J. Radford
2009 S. Dolting
2010 S. Dolting
2011 J. Gillam
2012 J. Gillam
2013 J. Gillam/J. Hayes
2014 J. Hayes
2015 R. Townsend
2016 R. Townsend
2017 R. Townsend
2018 R. Townsend
2019 M. French

2020 M. French
2021 M. French
2022 M. French/J. Green
2023 J. Green/S. Redman

Secretary 

1941
1942
1943
1944 E. Foster
1945 E. Foster
1946 A. Forrest
1947
1948
1949 J. Austin
1950
1951 J. Clarke
1952 N. Southby
1953 N. Southby
1954 N. Southby
1955 N. Southby
1956 N. Southby
1957 L. Rayner
1958 L. Rayner
1959 L. Rayner

1960 L. Rayner
1961 L. Rayner
1962 L. Rayner
1963 L. Rayner
1964 T. Snooks
1965 T. Snooks
1966 T. Snooks
1967 T. Snooks
1968 R. French
1969 R. French
1970 T. Snooks
1971 R. French
1972 R. French
1973 G. Snooks
1974 K. Keegan
1975 P. White
1976 W. Jacobson
1977 G. Snooks/W. Jacobson
1978 G. Snooks
1979 K. Moles

1980 C. Ruffels
1981 P. Bennetts
1982 G. Snooks
1983 G. Snooks
1984 G. Snooks/G. Walker
1985 G. Monson
1986 S. E. Conway
1987 G. Walker/S. E. Ellis
1988 S. E. Ellis/K. Moles
1989 S. Ellis
1990 J. Parker
1991 A. Wiseman
1992 A. Wiseman
1993 K. Snooks
1994 K. Snooks
1995 K. Snooks
1996 D. Snooks
1997 P. Hardy
1998 G. Charles
1999 D. Snooks/D. Close

2000 K. Hayes/D. Snooks
2001 K. Hayes
2002 K. Hayes
2003 K. Hayes
2004 A. Kaine/N. Townsend
2005 A. Kaine/N. Townsend
2006 Y. Radford/N. Townsend
2007 N. Townsend/Ta. Busscher
2008 Ta. Busscher/Y. Radford
2009 N. Townsend/K. Hayes
2010 J. Gillan
2011 K. Hayes
2012 K. Hayes
2013 K. Lyons
2014 K. Lyons
2015 T. Vant
2016 N. Townsend
2017 N. Townsend
2018 L. Jones
2019 T. Vant

2020 T. Vant
2021 T. Vant
2022 T. Vant
2023 T. Vant/T. Walker

Treasurer 

1951 D. McQuitty
1952 B. Cloudsdale
1953 B. Cloudsdale
1954 B. Cloudsdale
1955 B. Cloudsdale
1956 B. Cloudsdale
1957 B. Cloudsdale
1958 T. McMahon
1959 T. McMahon

1960 T. McMahon
1961 T. McMahon
1962 T. McMahon
1963 T. McMahon
1964 T. McMahon
1965 T. McMahon
1966 G. Proverbs
1967 E. Gillett
1968 E. Gillett
1969 B. Young
1970 B. Young
1971 B. Young
1972 B. Young
1973 B. Young
1974 E. Gillett
1975 T. Snooks
1976 T. Snooks
1977 I. Moore
1978 K. Keegan
1979 K. Keegan

1980 B. Walker
1981 C. Ruffels
1982 G. Monson
1983 G. Monson
1984 G. Monson
1985 G. Dyke/T. Marshall
1986 N. McCarthy/J. Mathews
1987 G. Monson/S. Milne
1988 D. Robinson
1989 K. Milne
1990 K. Milne
1991 B. walker/T. Snooks
1992 B. Walker/T. Snooks
1993 D. Snooks
1994 D. Snooks
1995 D. Snooks
1996 A. Clarke
1997 D. Snooks
1998 D. Snooks
1999 D. Snooks

2000 D. Snooks
2001 D. Snooks
2002 D. Snooks
2003 D. Snooks
2004 N. Murray/D. Snooks
2005 D. Snooks
2006 D. Ryan
2007 D. Ryan
2008 D. Snooks/Sch. Dolting
2009 D. Snooks/Sch. Dolting
2010 D. Snooks
2011 D. Snooks
2012 S. Swain
2013 S. Swain
2014 S. Swain/D. Snooks
2015 C. Hayes
2016 C. Hayes/L. Jones
2017 L. Jones
2018 N. Townsend
2019 Gar. Quirk

2020 M. Faulkner
2021 M. Faulkner
2022 M. Faulkner
2023 M. Faulkner

Coach 

1941 Alf. Muir
1942
1943
1944 G. Huxley
1945 A. Muir
1946 I. Clay
1947 I. Clay
1948 G. Gneil
1949 G. Gneil
1950 G. Gneil
1951 N. Gale
1952 R. Kerr
1953 R. Kerr
1954 R. Kerr
1955 M. Redman
1956 R. Munday
1957 R. Kerr
1958 D. Briggs
1959 A. Jones

1960 A. Jones
1961 D. Anderson
1962 B. Flint
1963 B. Flint
1964 J. Webster
1965 J. Webster
1966 J. Webster
1967 M. Bramich
1968 B. Flint
1969 D. Hodgetts
1970 K. Redman
1971 K. Redman
1972 G. Lynch
1973 R. Webb
1974 W. Hayes
1975 W. Hayes
1976 N. McCarthy
1977 N. McCarthy
1978 W. Scott
1979 W. Scott

1980 J. Seelig
1981 J. Seelig
1982 N. Gardiner
1983 N. Gardiner
1984 G. Cross
1985 B. Newman/N. Gardiner
1986 I. Hammond
1987 P. French
1988 W. Gaffney
1989 W. Gaffney
1990 I. Hammond
1991 C. Loring
1992 C. Loring
1993 C. Loring
1994 R. Lavell
1995 R. Lavell
1996 R. Lavell
1997 R. Lavell
1998 R. Lavell
1999 A. Baldock

2000 A. Baldock
2001 A. Baldock
2002 R. Townsend
2003 R. Townsend
2004 A. Smith
2005 A. Smith
2006 A. Smith
2007 S. McCullogh
2008 S. McCullogh
2009 A. Hering/R. Townsend
2010 A. Hering/C. Stretton
2011 A. McClaren
2012 D. Crawford
2013 D. Crawford
2014 B. Holohan
2015 D. Crawford/R. Townsend
2016 R. Baldock
2017 Z. Murphy
2018 C. Wedd
2019 C. Wedd

2020 Gav. Quirk
2021 Gav. Quirk
2022 R. Baldock
2023 N. Holland

Best and Fairest 

1951 J. Hancock
1952 J. Hancock (2)
1953 K. Trebilco
1954 M. Redman
1955 L. Maney
1956 A. Templar
1957 E. Gardiner
1958 L. Munday
1959 D. Proverbs

1960 D. Hall
1961 W. Parker
1962 L. Redman
1963 D. Guy
1964 D. Hall (2)
1965 B. Hanigan
1966 H. Stubbs/K. Keegan
1967 J. Webster
1968 J. Meehan
1969 J. Munro
1970 D. Mason
1971 K. Edwards
1972 G. Snooks
1973 G. Davis
1974 T. Richards
1975 I. Moore
1976 C. Ruffels
1977 G. Jackson
1978 G. Sweeney
1979 G. Jackson (2)

1980 N. McCarthy
1981 D. Green
1982 D. Green (2)
1983 G. Catlin
1984 N. Gardiner 
1985 N. Gardiner (2)
1986 N. Gardiner (3)
1987 W. Gaffney
1988 M. Saltmarsh
1989 D. Chilcott
1990 D. Zeuschner
1991 P. Guard
1992 C. Loring
1993 M. Hayes
1994 J. Overton
1995 D. Bowden
1996 T. Waller
1997 M. Hayes (2)
1998 T. Waller
1999 R. Townsend

2000 N. White
2001 R. Townsend (2)
2002 M. Hayes (3)
2003 M. Van Ommen
2004 R. Townsend (3)
2005 A. Smith/D. Crawford
2006 R. Townsend (4)
2007 A. P. Butler/R. Townsend (5) 
2008 R. Townsend (6)
2009 J. Stubbs
2010 R. Baldock
2011 J. Brakey
2012 K. Lamprey
2013 A. Dudman
2014 J. Collins/J. Brakey (2)
2015 K. Lamprey (2)
2016 J. Brakey (3)
2017 C. Wedd
2018 K. Bracken
2019 Z. Walker

2020 Cancelled season (COVID-19)
2021 C. Wedd (2)
2022 C. Wedd (3)

Life Members 

A. Muir
M. Wiseman
W. Brakey
N. Southby
R. Harkness
D. Guy
P. White
M. Marshall
K. Keegan
D. Mason
G. Hall
G. Hammond
T. Snooks
G. Elliot
G. Davis
G. Snooks
P. Sweeney
I. Moore
K. Edwards
W. Casey

R. Stevens
B. Walker
T. Edwards
M. Jacobson
N. McCarthy
T. Marshall
M. Creedon
R. Mills
G. Monson
M. Gardiner
D. Wiseman
E. Jacobson
R. Milne
D. Robinson
J. Potts
M. Kelly
B. Thompson
R. Scott
S. Kelly
W. Parker

R. Lavell
D. Snooks
N. Murray
L. Clarke
Mrs. E. Snooks
R. Townsend
M. Hayes
Mrs. K. Hayes
J. Radford
G. French
W. Kaine
Mrs. A. Kaine
Mrs. N. Townsend
Mrs. Y Radford
P. Swain
M. French
D. Gillam
L. Wilkins
J. Gillam
N. Dolting

D. Crawford
D. Milne
I. Mollison
J. Hayes
S. Dolting
I. Gillam
A. Jones
L. Elphinstone
A. Dolting
Mrs. Sch Dolting
K. Purdy
J. Stubbs
S. Gray
A. P. Butler
D. Clark
R. Johnstone
S. Elphinstone
T. Bakes
C. Mallinson
J. Green

Junior Football Honour Roll

NTFL Under 18 

1997

Coach – A. Baldock
 
Captain – D. Gillam, N. Dolting, J. Denny
 
Best and Fairest – N. White

1998

Coach – T. Waller

Captain – C. Saltmarsh

Best and Fairest – B. Good

DFA Under 17 

Coach

2000 – W. Lowe

2001 – W. Lowe

2002 – W. Lowe

2003 – D. Crawford

2004 – J. Fry

2005 – J. Fry

2006 – J. Fry

2007 – J. Fry

2008 – G. Blyth

Captain

2000 – C. Sharman
 
2001 – I. Swain

2002 – M. Yaxley

2003 – C. Streets

2004 – B. Dobson

2005 – B. Dobson

2006 – J. French, N. Brakey

2007 – D. Hardy

2008 – B. French

Best and Fairest

2000 – L. Cooke

2001 – I. Swain

2002 – J. Collins

2003 – C. Streets, M. French

2004 – B. Dobson

2005 – D. Hardy

2006 – D. Hardy

2007 – D. Hardy

2008 – B. French

References 

Australian rules football clubs in Tasmania